TeeVee Indian is a political cartoonist who has worked primarily in the Telugu language. His real name is T. Venkatrao.

Early years

He was born in Eluru in West Godavari district on 2 February 1944. He learnt cartooning through a correspondence course offered by the Ray Burns School of Cartooning. After completing his college degree, he joined the Telugu daily Visalaandhra in 1961 as a cartoonist.

Work 

His cartoons also appeared in newspapers like Andhra Prabha and Vaartha, and magazines like Andhra Jyothi and Chalana Chitra. In 1991, his cartoons also appeared in the Russian humour magazine Krokodil. He contributed articles on cartooning to Andhra Jyothi, Wisdom and the Sunday editions of various newspapers, besides writing instructional books on the subject and conducting courses in cartooning.

Achievements 

TeeVee received a Lifetime Achievement award from the Indian Institute of Cartoonists in 2009.

Books 

Venkatrao, Ṭ., 1944-. Ṭīvī Rājakīya Kārṭūnulu, 1962-1997 =: Teevee's Political Cartoons, 1962-1997. Vijayavāḍa: Citrasūtra Pracuraṇalu, 1997.

References

External links 
TeeVee page at Indian Institute of Cartoonists
T. Venkatrao at WorldCat

Telugu writers
Indian cartoonists
People from West Godavari district
Writers from Andhra Pradesh